The Sulejman Pasha Tomb was the tomb of the Ottoman general of Albanian origin named Sulejman Bargjini. The tomb was ruined in November 1944 together with the Sulejman Pasha Mosque, and subsequently destroyed by the communist government. The monument of the "Unknown Soldier" was built later upon their former location.

It stood next to the Sylejman Pasha Mosque and is not to be confused with the Kapllan Pasha Tomb which was in the same neighborhood graveyard and still exists today.

See also 
 Et'hem Bey Mosque

References 

Buildings and structures in Tirana
Tombs in Albania
Buildings and structures demolished in the 20th century
Ottoman architecture in Albania